Mayfa' Abdel Rahman al-Qiyadi (born 1951 – 3 ِApril 2021) was a Yemeni short story writer and journalist. He studied at the Gorky Institute in Moscow and obtained an MA in 1982. He is known for his short stories which explore the social and political realities of Yemen. His first collection of short stories appeared in 1975, followed by a second one in 1983. His work has appeared in English translation in a 1988 anthology called The Literature of Modern Arabia (edited by Salma Khadra Jayyusi).

Abdel Rahman has worked for the Ministry of Information in Aden. He has also been a contributor to Yemeni journals such as Al-Nidaa. In 2010, as part of a court judgment against Al-Nidaa and its journalists, Abdel Rahman was given a three-month suspended jail sentence.

References

1951 births
Yemeni writers
Yemeni journalists
Place of birth missing (living people)
2021 deaths